Phyllonorycter rileyella is a moth of the family Gracillariidae. It is known from Illinois, Missouri, Texas, Florida, Maine and Ohio in the United States.

The wingspan is 6–8 mm.

The larvae feed on Quercus species, including Quercus imbricaria, Quercus obtusifolia, Quercus rubra and Quercus stellata. They mine the leaves of their host plant. The mine has the form of a blotch mine on the underside of the leaf.

References

External links
mothphotographersgroup

rileyella
Moths of North America
Moths described in 1875